The NEVER Openweight 6-Man Tag Team Championship is a professional wrestling championship owned by the New Japan Pro-Wrestling (NJPW) promotion.

NEVER is an acronym of the terms "New Blood", "Evolution", "Valiantly", "Eternal", and "Radical" and was a NJPW-promoted series of events, which featured younger up-and-coming talent and outside wrestlers not signed to the promotion. The title was announced on December 21, 2015, with the first champions crowned on January 4, 2016. Through NJPW's relationship with Ring of Honor (ROH), the title has also been defended in the American promotion. The championship is contested for by teams of three wrestlers and is the first title of its kind in the history of NJPW. The title's openweight nature means that both heavyweight and junior heavyweight wrestlers are eligible to challenge for it.

Chaos (Jay Briscoe, Mark Briscoe and Toru Yano) were the first champions in the title's history. Los Ingobernables de Japón (Bushi, Evil and Sanada) and Chaos (Tomohiro Ishii, Toru Yano, and Beretta) both hold the record for shortest reign at 1 day each, while Chaos (Hirooki Goto, Tomohiro Ishii and Yoshi-Hashi) hold the record for longest reign at 454 days and record for most defenses at 9 defenses. Los Ingobernables de Japón also hold the record for most reigns as a team with three. Individually, Bushi and Evil hold the record for title defenses with 6 each. Bushi, Evil, Tonga, and Yano share the record for individual reigns at 4 each. As a faction, Bullet Club have held the titles on the most occasions (The Elite and Super Villains were part of Bullet Club while holding the titles) though never more than twice with the same three wrestlers.

Title history

Combined reigns

By team

By wrestler

See also
NEVER (professional wrestling)
NEVER Openweight Championship

References

External links
Official title history at njpw.co.jp
Title history at Wrestling-Titles.com

New Japan Pro-Wrestling championships
Professional wrestling trios tag team champion lists